Ingles Bottom Archeological Sites is a set of archaeological sites, and national historic district located along the New River near Radford, Montgomery County, Virginia.  The district encompasses a variety of archaeological sites relating to human occupation from 8000 B.C. to the present.  It includes the site of a log cabin built about 1762, as the home of William Ingles (1729-1782) and his wife Mary Draper Ingles (1732-1815).  The property also includes the site of a stable, family cemetery, and Ingles Ferry.

It was listed on the National Register of Historic Places in 1978.

References

Archaeological sites on the National Register of Historic Places in Virginia
Historic districts on the National Register of Historic Places in Virginia
Houses completed in 1762
Houses in Montgomery County, Virginia
National Register of Historic Places in Montgomery County, Virginia